Lake Akna may refer to:
Lake Akna (Kotayk), a lake in the Geghama mountains, Armenia
Lake Akna (Armavir), a lake in the Ararat plain, Armenia